Lavarand was a hardware random number generator designed by Silicon Graphics that worked by taking pictures of the patterns made by the floating material in lava lamps, extracting random data from the pictures, and using the result to seed a pseudorandom number generator.

Details
Although the secondary part of the random number generation uses a pseudorandom number generator, the full process essentially qualifies as a "true" random number generator due to the random seed that is used.  However, its applicability is limited by its low bandwidth.

It was covered under the now-expired , titled "Method for seeding a pseudo-random number generator with a cryptographic hash of a digitization of a chaotic system." by Landon Curt Noll, Robert G. Mende, and Sanjeev Sisodiya.

From 1997 to 2001,
there was a Web site at lavarand.sgi.com demonstrating the technique. Landon Curt Noll, one of the process's originators, went on to help develop LavaRnd, which does not use lava lamps.  Despite the short life of lavarand.sgi.com, it is often cited as an example of an online random number source.

, Cloudflare maintains a similar system of lava lamps for securing Internet traffic.

References

External links
Archived version of original Lavarand.com from Archive.org (pictures do not work)
Cloudflare blog post about LavaRand in production

Silicon Graphics
Random number generation